Germany at the 1994 Winter Olympics. 112 athletes, 79 men and 33 women participated in 11 sports. Germany came third in the medal rankings with 9 gold, 7 silver and 8 bronze medals. The biathlete Mark Kirchner was Germany's flagbearer under the opening ceremony.

Medalists

Competitors
The following is the list of number of competitors in the Games.

Alpine skiing

Men

Women

Biathlon

Men

Women

Bobsleigh

Cross-country skiing

Men

Figure skating

Women

Pairs

Ice Dancing

Freestyle skiing

Men

Women

Ice hockey

Men's tournament 
Team roster
Helmut De Raaf
Klaus Merk
Josef Heiß
Mirko Lüdemann
Torsten Kienass
Jörg Mayr
Alexander Serikow
Andreas Niederberger
Rick Amann
Uli Hiemer
Jason Meyer
Thomas Brandl
Leo Stefan
Bernd Truntschka
Raimund Hilger
Benoît Doucet
Wolfgang Kummer
Georg Franz
Dieter Hegen
Stefan Ustorf
Michael Rumrich
Jan Benda
Jörg Handrick
Head coach: Luděk Bukač and Franz Reindl

Results

Luge

Men

Women

Nordic combined

Ski jumping

Speed skating

Men

Women

References

Official Olympic Reports
International Olympic Committee results database

Nations at the 1994 Winter Olympics
1994
Winter Olympics